This is a list of rural localities in Omsk Oblast. Omsk Oblast (Omskaya oblast) is a federal subject of Russia (an oblast), located in southwestern Siberia. Its population is 1,977,665 (2010 Census) with the majority, 1.15 million, living in Omsk, the administrative center.

Locations 
 1st Fominovka - village
 2nd Fominovka - village
 18 Partsezd - village
 2595 km - railway station
 2647 km - railway station
 2672 km - railway station
 2779 km - railway station
 2783 km - railway station
 2786 km - railway station
 2797 km - railway station
 2812 km - railway station
 2826 km - railway station
 Azovo - selo, administrative center of Azovsky Nemetsky National District
 Baykal - village
 Bolshiye Uki - selo
 Golbshtadt - village
 Kolosovka - selo, administrative center of Kolosovsky District
 Moskalenki - administrative center of Moskalensky District
 Nizhnyaya Omka - selo
 Odesskoye - selo, administrative center of Odessky District
 Okunevo - village
 Rostovka - settlement, administrative center of Omsky District
 Ryzhkovo - village
 Sedelnikovo - selo, administrative center of Sedelnikovsky District
 Ust-Ishim - selo, administrative center of Ust-Ishimsky District
 XVI Partsezd - village
 Znamenskoye - selo, administrative center of Znamensky District

See also
 
 Lists of rural localities in Russia

References

Omsk Oblast